The Israel Defense Forces 146th Armor Division, also known as the Ha-Mapatz Formation ("Bang"), is a reserve-service armored infantry division in the IDF. It is subordinate to the Northern Regional Command.

Formed in 1954, it fought in the Suez Crisis and Six-Day War as the 38th Division. In the latter conflict, the division was led by Major General Ariel Sharon. During the Yom Kippur War, the division fought in the battles of the northern Golan under Major General Moshe Peled. It was known as 319th division from after the Yom Kipur War to September 2020 when it received its old number.

Units
 319th "Ha-Mapatz" Division
 2nd "Carmeli" (Reserve) Infantry Brigade
 4th "Kiryati" (Reserve) Armored Brigade
 205th "Iron Fist" (Reserve) Armored Brigade
 226th (Reserve) Paratroopers Brigade
 228th (Reserve) Infantry Brigade
 213th "Revival" (Reserve) Artillery Regiment
 Divisional Signal Battalion

See also
 Battle of Abu-Ageila (1967)

References

External links

Northern Command (Israel)
Divisions of Israel
Military units and formations established in 1954